Phanera yunnanensis (taxonomic synonym Bauhinia yunnanensis) is a plant with the common names Chinese orchid tree, Yunnan orchid or orchid vine, native to China (Sichuan, Yunnan, Guizhou) and W. Indochina.  It is a perennial dicot described as a shrub or vine. It is in the Fabaceae family, has orchid-like flowers and has been introduced to Florida, in the USA.

References

yunnanensis
Flora of Florida
Fabales of Asia